Lois B. DeFleur (born June 25, 1936) was president of Binghamton University from 1990 to 2010. She came to the university after being provost at the University of Missouri. Before that she had served as a sociology professor at Missouri State University and Washington State University. She has a doctorate in sociology from the University of Illinois. She studied juvenile delinquency in Latin America and has done extensive work in the fields of deviant behavior and occupational socialization.

DeFleur became the president at Binghamton University in 1990, making her the longest serving president of the university to date. She resigned in disgrace at the end of July 2010  after being implicated in the Binghamton University basketball scandal.

DeFleur at Binghamton 
A few of the events occurring under her administration:
 Began an aggressive fundraising campaign, more than doubling giving for multiple consecutive years.
 Moved athletics to Division I from Division III, changing the school's mascot from the Colonial to the Bearcat.
 Binghamton's publications rankings increased (although some have declined drastically in recent years, such as overall ranking in the Princeton Review).
 Reorganized schools at Binghamton: the College of Community and Public Affairs and the School of Education were created July 1, 2006, from the former School of Education and Human Development.
 Funded construction of over more than a dozen new buildings, including a new residence community, university union addition, events center, academic complex and the new Downtown University Center.
 The University’s endowment has risen from approximately $8 million to $64.5 million.
 Faculty research awards have increased 60 percent.
 Binghamton completed its first-ever comprehensive gifts campaign more than a year early, and at 121 percent of its goal.
 Binghamton was designated a New York State Center of Excellence in 2006.
 Announced retirement weeks before major scandal involving the basketball team was revealed to the public.
University was not included in rankings and lists of most competitive colleges (such as BARRON'S GUIDE TO THE MOST COMPETITIVE COLLEGES) but included as a Best Buy.;
 Implicated for ethical violations that had been hinted at throughout her tenure as university president but which were clearly described in the Kaye Report;

Retirement 
DeFleur resigned after being implicated in the Binghamton University basketball scandal in July 2010 to focus on her personal life.

Criticisms 

 Although the state ethics commission has never accused DeFleur of wrongdoing, some question the propriety of DeFleur sitting on boards of companies that do millions of dollars in business with the university that she oversees. For years, she was on the board of Energy East, in which she had held more than half a million dollars in stock. She is also a paid adviser to M&T Bank, a financial institution that has long had sole rights to operate on the Binghamton campus.

References

External links
 Binghamton profile of DeFleur
 Past Winners of Harold W. McGraw, Jr. Prize in Education

1936 births
Living people
Binghamton University faculty
Blackburn College (Illinois) alumni
Indiana University alumni
Presidents of Binghamton University
University of Illinois Urbana-Champaign alumni
University of Missouri faculty